United Presbyterian Church, Summerset, also known as Scotch Ridge United Presbyterian Church, is an historic structure located in rural Warren County, Iowa, United States.   It was built in 1885 and listed on the National Register of Historic Places in 1976. The founders of the church were Scotch-Irish immigrants who could trace their ancestry to Scotland and were proud of their Scottish heritage.

Scotch Ridge United Presbyterian Church was begun on August 13, 1853.  On that day Robert McElroy went to Chariton, Iowa to get the charter. The first church building was built in 1857 for $1,000.  Pete Schooler and his wife sold two acres of the land for $30 on January 3, 1865, for a new Presbyterian Churchyard.  On April 28 of the same year William Hastie and his wife sold one acre of adjacent land for $25 for a cemetery.  The present frame church building was built in 1885 for $4,000 in the Gothic Revival style. Additional land for the cemetery was added in 1898 and 1971.

References

Religious organizations established in 1853
Churches completed in 1885
19th-century Presbyterian church buildings in the United States
Presbyterian churches in Iowa
Carpenter Gothic church buildings in Iowa
Churches on the National Register of Historic Places in Iowa
Scotch-Irish American history
Scottish-American culture in Iowa
1853 establishments in Iowa
National Register of Historic Places in Warren County, Iowa